Karlīne Štāla (born 5 March 1986) is a race car driver from Latvia.

Career history

Karting 
Stala enter in karting series in 2000.
 2000 : 6th in Latvian championship, ICA junior class
 2001 : Latvian championship, ICA junior class ; Austrian championship, Rotax Max junior class
 2002 : 5th in Latvian championship, Rotax max junior class ; 7th in Austrian championship, Rotax max junior class
 2003 : 2nd in Latvian championship, Rotax max junior class ; 4th in Austrian Rotax max championship ; 19th in the Euro Rotax Max challenge
 2004 : 8th in Euro Rotax max challenge ; Participate to the Master of Sports of Latvia

Touring racing 
In 2003 and 2004 she competed in the Estland Toyota Yaris Cup with a Toyota Yaris.
 2003 : 12th in Yaris Cup (only Parnu round)
 2004 : 9th in Yaris Cup (only Riga2 round)
 2005 : 8th in Finnish championship in Legends category with a 1937 Ford

Formula racing 
In 2003, she tested a Formula Ford and a Formula BMW.

In 2006, she competed in the Belgian Formula Renault 1.6 championship finishing 15 overall (11 points) with the MRD Motorsport Europe team.

In 2007, with team Team Astromega, she won the Belgian Formula Renault 1.6 championship with 178 points, 2 wins, 10 podiums and 2 fastest laps. She was invited to test the World Series by Renault car (Formula Renault 3.5L) at the Circuit Paul Ricard in November 2007 with Fortec Motorsport team, like the best 2.0L and 3.5L drivers.

Career results

References

External links

Team Astromega website with Stala career information.

1986 births
Living people
Sportspeople from Riga
Latvian racing drivers
Female racing drivers
Belgian Formula Renault 1.6 drivers
German Formula Three Championship drivers
Team Astromega drivers